Paulo César Fonseca do Nascimento (born 13 January 1978), known as Tinga, is a Brazilian former professional footballer who played as a central midfielder.

After making a name for himself at Grêmio, he went on to play professionally in, other than his country, Japan, Portugal and Germany, representing Borussia Dortmund in the latter nation.

Club career
Born in Porto Alegre, Tinga started playing professionally with local Grêmio Foot-Ball Porto Alegrense, receiving his nickname from the name of the Restinga quarter where he grew up. In 1999 he was loaned to J2 League club Kawasaki Frontale, moving to Botafogo de Futebol e Regatas in the following year, also on loan.

In January 2004, following a wages dispute, Tinga left Grêmio and signed with Sporting Clube de Portugal, for the rest of that season and two more. However, he would only serve as third-choice in the Portuguese capital side, although he scored in a 2–0 home win against SK Rapid Wien in the club's runner-up run in the UEFA Cup.

Tinga returned to Brazil in December 2004, being sold to Sport Club Internacional and being instrumental in the team's Copa Libertadores success in 2006 as he scored against São Paulo FC in a 4–3 aggregate win. Following these displays, he signed a three-year contract with Borussia Dortmund in Germany for R$8 million. On 26 August he assisted and was booked in his first game, a 3–1 win at VfB Stuttgart, going on to only miss four Bundesliga matches combined in his first two campaigns and adding eight goals.

On 1 April 2010, after not having his contract with Borussia renewed, the 31-year-old Tinga left the club. He re-joined former club Internacional the following month and, on 17 May 2012, moved to Cruzeiro Esporte Clube.

On 30 April 2015, Tinga announced his retirement after his Cruzeiro contract ended.

International career
Tinga made his debut with Brazil in 2001. After a five-year absence he was recalled to the national team by newly appointed manager Dunga, for a friendly against Switzerland, earning his third cap on 15 November 2006.

Racism issue
On 12 February 2014, after a 2–1 loss against Real Garcilaso for the Libertadores Cup, Tinga suffered racist abuse from the home fans, who made monkey noises whenever he touched the ball. He subsequently spoke with sadness of the events, that took place in a "neighbouring country" and "still occurred in 2014".

Career statistics

Club

International

Honours

Club
Internacional
 Copa Libertadores: 2006, 2010
 Campeonato Gaúcho: 2011, 2012
 Recopa Sudamericana: 2011

Cruzeiro
 Campeonato Brasileiro Série A: 2013, 2014
 Campeonato Mineiro: 2014

Individual
 Campeonato Brasileiro Série A Team of the Year: 2005

References

External links

1978 births
Living people
Footballers from Porto Alegre
Brazilian footballers
Association football midfielders
Brazil international footballers
Campeonato Brasileiro Série A players
Grêmio Foot-Ball Porto Alegrense players
Botafogo de Futebol e Regatas players
Sport Club Internacional players
Cruzeiro Esporte Clube players
J2 League players
Kawasaki Frontale players
Primeira Liga players
Sporting CP footballers
Bundesliga players
Borussia Dortmund players
Brazilian expatriate footballers
Brazilian expatriate sportspeople in Japan
Expatriate footballers in Japan
Brazilian expatriate sportspeople in Portugal
Expatriate footballers in Portugal
Brazilian expatriate sportspeople in Germany
Expatriate footballers in Germany